1951 in professional wrestling describes the year's events in the world of professional wrestling.

List of notable promotions 
Only one promotion held notable shows in 1951.

Calendar of notable shows

Championship changes

EMLL

NWA

Debuts
Debut date uncertain:
Baron Mikel Scicluna
Chris Tolos
Don Fargo
Espectro I
Happy Humphrey
Mad Dog Vachon
Stan Holek
April 12  Bill Miller
September 13  Luther Lindsay
October 1  Kinji Shibuya
October 28  Rikidozan

Births
Date unknown
A. J. Petrucci 
The Great Wojo 
January 6  Fishman(died in 2017) 
January 10  Pez Whatley|(died in 2005) 
January 14  Michael Porter (died in 2010)
January 15  Mano Negra
January 20  Kung Fu(died in 2001) 
January 23  Vivian Vachon (died in 1991)
January 27  Ken Timbs(died 2004) 
February 20  Dos Caras
February 25  Mr. Pogo(died in 2017) 
March 3  Bob Della Serra 
March 9  Norvell Austin 
March 21  Buck Zumhofe
March 25  Jumbo Tsuruta(died in 2000) 
April 3  Ron Starr(died in 2017) 
April 14  Willie Williams (died in 2019) 
May 11  Mark Rocco(died in 2020)
May 19  Dick Slater (died in 2018) 
June 13  Antonio Peña(died in 2006) 
June 18  Salvatore Bellomo(died in 2019) 
June 26  Larry Sharpe(died in 2017) 
July 15  Jesse Ventura
July 24  Skip Young(died in 2010) 
August 21  Keith Hart
August 25  Steve Regal
September 10:
Greg Valentine
Steve Keirn
September 13  Jerry Stubbs
September 20  Mike Graham(died in 2012) 
September 22  Doug Somers (died in 2017) 
October 7  Terry Orndorff
October 14  Mike Miller 
October 28  Mike Sharpe(died in 2016) 
November 30  Sangre Chicana
December 3:
Ray Candy(died in 1994) 
Riki Choshu
December 5  Larry Zbyszko
December 13  Ricky Rice 
December 20  Ari Romero(died in 2013)

Deaths
 July 28 Janet Wolfe (18)
 October 20 Ed Virag (39)

References

 
professional wrestling